Denise Loop (born 19 May 1994) is a German politician. Loop became a member of the Bundestag in the 2021 German federal election. She is affiliated with the Alliance 90/The Greens party.

She became a member of the Green Youth organisation (Grüne Jugend) in 2010. She became a member of the Alliance 90/The Greens party in 2016.

References 

Living people
1994 births
People from Itzehoe
21st-century German politicians
21st-century German women politicians
Members of the Bundestag for Alliance 90/The Greens
Members of the Bundestag 2021–2025
Female members of the Bundestag